In computer science, a suffix tree (also called PAT tree or, in an earlier form, position tree) is a compressed trie containing all the suffixes of the given text as their keys and positions in the text as their values. Suffix trees allow particularly fast implementations of many important string operations.

Suffix trees also provided one of the first linear-time solutions for the longest common substring problem. These speedups come at a cost: storing a string's suffix tree typically requires significantly more space than storing the string itself.

History
Weiner's Algorithm B maintains several auxiliary data structures, to achieve an over all run time linear in the size of the constructed trie. The latter can still be  nodes, e.g. for  Weiner's Algorithm C finally uses compressed tries to achieve linear overall storage size and run time.
Donald Knuth subsequently characterized the latter as "Algorithm of the Year 1973". 
The text book  reproduced Weiner's results in a simplified and more elegant form, introducing the term position tree.

On the other hand, McCreight could dispense with most of Weiner's auxiliary data structures; only suffix links remained.

 further simplified the construction. He provided the first online-construction of suffix trees, now known as Ukkonen's algorithm, with running time that matched the then fastest algorithms.

 gave the first suffix tree construction algorithm that is optimal for all alphabets.  In particular, this is the first linear-time algorithm 
for strings drawn from an alphabet of integers in a polynomial range.  Farach's algorithm has become the basis for new algorithms for constructing both suffix trees and suffix arrays, for example, in external memory, compressed, succinct, etc.

Definition
The suffix tree for the string  of length  is defined as a tree such that:
 Except for the root, every internal node has at least two children.
 No two edges starting out of a node can have string-labels beginning with the same character.

Since such a tree does not exist for all strings,  is padded with a terminal symbol not seen in the string (usually denoted $). Since all internal non-root nodes are branching, there can be at most n −  1 such nodes, and n + (n − 1) + 1 = 2n nodes in total (n leaves, n − 1 internal non-root nodes, 1 root).

Suffix links are a key feature for older linear-time construction algorithms, although most newer algorithms, which are based on Farach's algorithm, dispense with suffix links. In a complete suffix tree, all internal non-root nodes have a suffix link to another internal node. See for example the suffix link from the node for ANA to the node for NA in the figure above. Suffix links are also used in some algorithms running on the tree.

A generalized suffix tree is a suffix tree made for a set of strings instead of a single string. It represents all suffixes from this set of strings. Each string must be terminated by a different termination symbol.

Functionality

A suffix tree for a string  of length  can be built in  time, if the letters come from an alphabet of integers in a polynomial range (in particular, this is true for constant-sized alphabets).
For larger alphabets, the running time is dominated by first sorting the letters to bring them into a range of size ; in general, this takes  time.
The costs below are given under the assumption that the alphabet is constant.

Assume that a suffix tree has been built for the string  of length , or that a generalised suffix tree has been built for the set of strings  of total length .
You can:

 Search for strings:
 Check if a string  of length  is a substring in  time.
 Find the first occurrence of the patterns  of total length  as substrings in  time.
 Find all  occurrences of the patterns  of total length  as substrings in  time.

 Find properties of the strings:
 Find all maximal pairs, maximal repeats or supermaximal repeats in  time.
 Find the Lempel–Ziv decomposition in  time.
 Find the longest repeated substrings in  time.
 Find the most frequently occurring substrings of a minimum length in  time.
 Find the shortest substrings occurring only once in  time.

The suffix tree can be prepared for constant time lowest common ancestor retrieval between nodes in  time. One can then also:
 Search for a pattern P of length m with at most k mismatches in  time, where z is the number of hits.
 Find the longest palindromic substring of a given string (using the generalized suffix tree of the string and its reverse) in linear time.

Applications 
Suffix trees can be used to solve a large number of string problems that occur in text-editing, free-text search, computational biology and other application areas. Primary applications include:
 String search, in O(m) complexity, where m is the length of the sub-string (but with initial O(n) time required to build the suffix tree for the string)
 Finding the longest repeated substring
 Finding the longest common substring
 Finding the longest palindrome in a string

Suffix trees are often used in bioinformatics applications, searching for patterns in DNA or protein sequences (which can be viewed as long strings of characters). The ability to search efficiently with mismatches might be considered their greatest strength. Suffix trees are also used in data compression; they can be used to find repeated data, and can be used for the sorting stage of the Burrows–Wheeler transform. Variants of the LZW compression schemes use suffix trees (LZSS). A suffix tree is also used in suffix tree clustering, a data clustering algorithm used in some search engines.

Implementation
If each node and edge can be represented in  space, the entire tree can be represented in  space. The worst-case space usage of a suffix tree is seen with a fibonacci word, giving the full  nodes.

An important choice when making a suffix tree implementation is the parent-child relationships between nodes. The most common is using linked lists called sibling lists. Each node has a pointer to its first child, and to the next node in the child list it is a part of. Other implementations with efficient running time properties use hash maps, sorted or unsorted arrays (with array doubling), or balanced search trees. We are interested in:
 The cost of finding the child on a given character.
 The cost of inserting a child.
 The cost of enlisting all children of a node (divided by the number of children in the table below).

Let  be the size of the alphabet. Then you have the following costs:

The insertion cost is amortised, and that the costs for hashing are given for perfect hashing.

The large amount of information in each edge and node makes the suffix tree very expensive, consuming about 10 to 20 times the memory size of the source text in good implementations. The suffix array reduces this requirement to a factor of 8 (for array including LCP values built within 32-bit address space and 8-bit characters.) This factor depends on the properties and may reach 2 with usage of 4-byte wide characters (needed to contain any symbol in some UNIX-like systems, see wchar_t) on 32-bit systems. Researchers have continued to find smaller indexing structures.

Parallel construction 

Various parallel algorithms to speed up suffix tree construction have been proposed.
Recently, a practical parallel algorithm for suffix tree construction with  work (sequential time) and  span has been developed. The algorithm achieves good parallel scalability on shared-memory multicore machines and can index the human genome – approximately 3GB – in under 3 minutes using a 40-core machine.

External construction

Though linear, the memory usage of a suffix tree is significantly higher
than the actual size of the sequence collection.  For a large text,
construction may require external memory approaches.

There are theoretical results for constructing suffix trees in external
memory.
The algorithm by 
is theoretically optimal, with an I/O complexity equal to that of sorting.
However the overall intricacy of this algorithm has prevented, so far, its
practical implementation.

On the other hand, there have been practical works for constructing
disk-based suffix trees
which scale to (few) GB/hours.
The state of the art methods are TDD,
TRELLIS,
DiGeST,
and
B2ST.

TDD and TRELLIS scale up to the entire human genome resulting in a disk-based suffix tree of a size in the tens of gigabytes. However, these methods cannot handle efficiently collections of sequences exceeding 3GB.  DiGeST performs significantly better and is able to handle collections of sequences in the order of 6GB in about 6 hours.

All these methods can efficiently build suffix trees for the case when the
tree does not fit in main memory,
but the input does.
The most recent method, B2ST, scales to handle
inputs that do not fit in main memory. ERA  is a recent parallel suffix tree construction method that is significantly faster. ERA can index the entire human genome in 19 minutes on an 8-core desktop computer with 16GB RAM. On a simple Linux cluster with 16 nodes (4GB RAM per node), ERA can index the entire human genome in less than 9 minutes.

See also
 Suffix automaton

Notes

References
.
.
.
.
.
.
.
.
.
.
.
.
.
.
.

.
.
.
.
.
.

External links 
 Suffix Trees by Sartaj Sahni
 NIST's Dictionary of Algorithms and Data Structures: Suffix Tree
 Universal Data Compression Based on the Burrows-Wheeler Transformation: Theory and Practice, application of suffix trees in the BWT
 Theory and Practice of Succinct Data Structures, C++ implementation of a compressed suffix tree
 Ukkonen's Suffix Tree Implementation in C Part 1 Part 2 Part 3 Part 4 Part 5 Part 6
 Online Demo: Ukkonen's Suffix Tree Visualization

Trees (data structures)
Substring indices
String data structures
Computer science suffixes